Richard Sykes may refer to:
 Sir Richard Sykes (microbiologist) (born 1942), microbiologist, former Rector of Imperial College, London and Chairman of GlaxoSmithKline
 Richard Sykes (prelate) (1854–1920), Roman Catholic prelate, Apostolic Prefect of Zambesi (1915–1919)
 Sir Richard Sykes (diplomat) (1920–1979), British diplomat, assassinated in 1979
Richard Sykes (rugby union) (1839–1923), rugby player and landowner in North Dakota